Equus semplicatus, was a Pleistocene species of New World stilt-legged horse, and considered the type species for the stilt legged horses, one of three lineages of equids within the Americas, the other two being hippidionid and caballine horses. Now extinct, Equus semiplicatus once inhabited North America.

Fossils found William's Cave in Texas have been identified as Equus semiplicatus.

See also 
 Evolution of the horse

References 

Pleistocene horses
Neogene mammals of North America
Pleistocene species extinctions
Equus (genus)
Extinct animals of the United States
Quaternary mammals of North America
Prehistoric mammals of North America
Fossil taxa described in 1893